Erida is a 2021 Indian crime drama film directed by V. K. Prakash and scripted by YV Rajesh. The film was produced by Aji Medayil and Aroma Babu under the banner of Aroma Cinemas and Good Company in association with Prakash's Trends Ad Film Makers Pvt Ltd.

Erida is a reference to the Eris (mythology) the Greek goddess of conflict and discord. Samyuktha Menon plays the title character, while Nassar, Kishore, Hareesh Peradi and  Dharmajan Bolgatty play other pivotal roles.

Erida released through the OTT service Amazon Prime Video on 28 October 2021.

Cast 
 Samyuktha Menon as Erida
 Nassar as Shanker Ganesan
 Kishore as Madhi
 Hareesh Peradi as Vijay Maaran
 Harish Raj as Inspector Sundar
 Dharmajan Bolgatty
 Nizhagal Ravi

Reception 
A critic from The Times of India wrote that "While somewhere in the film is the seed of what could have been a fairly engaging film noir, the story just progresses with many flaws".

References

2021 multilingual films
2020s Tamil-language films
2020s Malayalam-language films
Films directed by V. K. Prakash